Gustav Stroem Christensen; (1 April 1929, Laesoe, Denmark – 9 August 2007, British Columbia, Canada), was an academic mathematician and engineer. He first worked as a radio operator in the Danish merchant marine. Later he was professor of electrical engineering at the University of Alberta in Edmonton for 27 years. In 1957 he won the Engineering Institute of Canada's prize and the Henry Birks Gold Medal in Engineering. He received a B.Sc. in engineering physics from the University of Alberta, Edmonton, in 1958 and a M.A.Sc. from the University of British Columbia, Vancouver in 1960. Later he obtained a Ph.D. in 1966, also in electrical engineering, from the University of British Columbia. Christensen wrote over 140 scientific papers, co-authored four books and four chapters.

Biography

Early life 

Christensen was born 1 April 1929 on a farm on the Danish island of Laesoe. The eighth of nine children, Gustav completed 9 years of schooling there in a one-room elementary school and a new junior high school. In 1945 he moved to Copenhagen to take a radio operator apprenticeship. He served with the Danish Merchant Navy for four years and on an American oil tanker for another two as a radio operator.

He emigrated to Canada and in 1969 he married an English immigrant, Penelope Janet Gardner, in Edmonton. They have two children, Lynne  and Neil.

Academic life 

After moving to Canada, Christensen completed his high school diploma in six months, mainly through correspondence school in Edmonton. He enrolled in engineering physics at the University of Alberta, where he won the top engineering award, the Henry Birks Gold Medal, in 1958 along with several other scholarships. After a summer with the National Research Council in Ottawa, he took his M.A. Sc. in Electrical Engineering at the University of British Columbia(UBC) in 1960 and subsequently obtained practical industrial experience with the BC Energy Board and Chemcell in Edmonton. He disliked the odours associated with chemical engineering left to complete his Ph.D. at UBC. His thesis (1966) was on the stability of non-linear mathematical models of systems.

In July 1966 he returned to University of Alberta as assistant professor and spent 27 years teaching, researching and taking a large load of administrative responsibilities for the Department of Electrical Engineering. His research was mainly concentrated on the optimum economic operation of various types of power systems, minimizing the energy lost in transmission lines while at the same time using, for example, the water available in all the hydro plants in a system to generate the maximum amount of power. This produced the cheapest energy and the best return on investment. Christensen authored over 140 scientific papers, four books and four chapters in books on his research specialities. Christensen retired as full professor in 1993 and moved to Mission, British Columbia.

Electric power industries 

Christensen was an active intervener in the National Energy Board (NEB) hearings which ultimately resulted in the rejection of the huge SE2 (Sumas Energy 2) coal-fired plant, one that would have emitted unacceptable pollution into the Fraser Valley funnel.

Final years 
After retirement, Christensen and his wife joined the Church of Jesus Christ of Latter-day Saints and they both served at the church's Family History Centre in Abbotsford. In co-operation with his wife Penny, a professional genealogist, he wrote his autobiography, the history of his parents' 172 descendants and a volume of translations of historical articles on Laesoe.
At the age of 75 Christensen took up an adjunct professorship in the School of Engineering Science at Simon Fraser University in Burnaby, BC, where he had an office, a computer and a grad student – but no salary. He spent one or two days there each week until he died. During this time he published a number of papers in the field of asymptotic stability of linear and nonlinear systems, a continuation of his Ph.D. work. He simplified the solutions to Lyapunov's stability theorems so that they are now useful to the electric power engineers and other practical engineers. Another development was the solution of the least absolute value estimation problem originally posed by Laplace in 1750 by using linear programming.

Christensen died 9 August 2007 at the age of 78.

Academic awards

Undergraduate 
  Engineering Institute of Canada (EIC) Prize 1957
 Two University of Alberta First Class Standing Prizes
 One University of Alberta Honor Prize
 Schlumberger Undergraduate Scholarship
 Henry Birks Gold Medal in Engineering, graduated with High Distinction

Postgraduate 
 Northern Electric Fellowship 1958
 National Research Council (NRC) Studentship 1959
 National Research Council (NRC) Studentship 1960
 University of British Columbia Scholarship 1964
 University of British Columbia Scholarship 1965

Civic award – British Columbia 
  District of Mission:	Award for achievement in mathematics, engineering and science.  May 7, 2007. Presented by Mayor James Atebe.

Scientific communities' memberships 
 Senior Member,  Institute of Electrical and Electronics Engineers (IEEE)
 Associate Member, Canadian Electricity Association (CEA), Canada
 Member, The Association of Professional Engineers and Geoscientists of Alberta (APEGA), Alberta

Publications

Theses

Books

Refereed chapters in books

Journal papers

References

External links

 Page 36 of Chronicle Magazine, UBC Alumni Chronicle, Autumn 82.
 The Abbotsford News - Obituaries: Dr. Gustav S. Christensen, Thu Aug 9th 2007.

People from Læsø Municipality
Electrical engineering academics
University of British Columbia Faculty of Applied Science alumni
University of Alberta alumni
20th-century Canadian engineers
Canadian electrical engineers
1929 births
2007 deaths
Senior Members of the IEEE